KTW could refer to:

 Kato language; ISO 639-3 code KTW
 Katowice International Airport, Poland; IATA airport code KTW
 Kentish Town West railway station, England; National Rail station code KTW
 Krung Thep Aphiwat Central Terminal, railway station in Bangkok, abbreviated KTW
 Kotdwara station, India Railways code KTW
 KTW (company), a manufacturer of Classic airsoft guns
 KKDZ, a Seattle, Washington radio station that held the call letters KTW from 1922 to 1975.
 KTRW, a Spokane, Washington radio station that uses the slogan "KTW"
 KTW Bullet, the original teflon-coated bullet, named after the initials of the inventors
 Klippel–Trénaunay–Weber syndrome
 KTW, initials for "Kunststoffe und Trinkwasser", a German quality standard for rubber and plastic components in contact with drinking water
 Kill the Winner hypothesis in microbiology